Chorea gravidarum is a rare type of chorea which presents with involuntary abnormal movement, characterized by abrupt, brief, nonrhythmic, nonrepetitive movement of any limb, often associated with nonpatterned facial grimaces. It is a complication of pregnancy which can be associated with eclampsia and its effects upon the basal ganglia. It is not a causal or pathologically distinct entity but a generic term for chorea of any cause starting during pregnancy. It is associated with history of Sydenham's chorea. It mostly occurs in young patients; the average age is 22 years.

Recently there has been a decline in incidence which is probably the result of a decline in rheumatic fever (RF), which was a major cause of chorea gravidarum before the use of antibiotics for streptococcal pharyngitis.

Pathophysiology
Several pathogenetic mechanisms for chorea gravidarum have been offered, but none have been proven.
History of either rheumatic fever or chorea is suspected: the suggestion is that estrogens and progesterone may sensitize dopamine receptors (presumably at a striatal level) and induce chorea in individuals who are vulnerable to this complication by virtue of preexisting pathology in the basal ganglia.
The relation to rheumatic fever was strengthened by many studies that showed that women with normal pregnancies before rheumatic fever developed chorea in subsequent pregnancies. At least 35% of patients have a definite history of acute rheumatic fever and Sydenham chorea; 4% of those with chorea gravidarum had acute rheumatic fever.

It has been suggested that use of oral contraceptives is an infrequent cause of chorea. A patient developed this chorea with no definite evidence of previous Sydenham's chorea or recent streptococcal infections, but had anti-basal ganglia antibodies, suggesting immunological basis for the pathophysiology of this chorea.

Diagnosis

Differential diagnoses

 Pelizaeus–Merzbacher disease
 Pantothenate kinase-associated neurodegeneration
 Ramsay Hunt syndrome
 Huntington's disease
 Striatonigral degeneration
 Lesch–Nyhan syndrome
 Systemic lupus erythematosus
 Lyme disease
 Torticollis
 Multiple system atrophy
 Tourette syndrome and other tic disorders
 Neuroacanthocytosis
 Viral encephalitis
 Neuronal ceroid lipofuscinosis
 Wilson's disease
 Olivopontocerebellar atrophy
 Familial paroxysmal choreoathetosis
 Benign hereditary chorea

Chorea can also be a manifestation of drug toxicity (for example, anticonvulsants, antiparkinson agents, neuroleptics, steroids, and estrogen), or a result of an infectious disease such as meningovascular syphilis, Lyme disease, viral encephalitis, and many others.

Treatment
Drug treatment is indicated for patients with severe disabling chorea. It is treated with haloperidol, chlorpromazine alone or in combination with diazepam, and also pimozide, which is another neuroleptic drug which may have fewer adverse effects than haloperidol. Valproic acid, chloral hydrate, risperidone, or phenobarbital can also be used.

See also
 Chorea

References

Further reading

External links 

Extrapyramidal and movement disorders
Pathology of pregnancy, childbirth and the puerperium